Amycterus is a genus of weevils belonging to the Amycterini tribe in the family Curculionidae, first described by Carl Johan Schönherr in 1823. The decisions for synonymy are based on work by Alonso-Zarazaga, M.A. and Lyal, C.H.C.  and Elwood Zimmerman (Aphalidura, Eustatius, Prophalidura).

The species of this genus are found in New South Wales, Victoria, Queensland the Northern Territory, and Tasmania.

Species
Species listed in the Australian Faunal Directory are:
Amycterus abnormis 
Amycterus amplicollis 
Amycterus amplipennis 
Amycterus anthracoides 
Amycterus brevicaudus 
Amycterus breviformis 
Amycterus carteri 
Amycterus caudatus 
Amycterus cultratus 
Amycterus cuneicaudatus 
Amycterus decipiens 
Amycterus durvillei 
Amycterus elongatus 
Amycterus exasperatus 
Amycterus exasperatus 
Amycterus falciformis 
Amycterus fergusoni 
Amycterus flavosetosus 
Amycterus flavovarius 
Amycterus forficulatus 
Amycterus foveatus 
Amycterus frenchi 
Amycterus helmsi 
Amycterus hopsoni 
Amycterus kosciuskoanus 
Amycterus leai 
Amycterus mastersii 
Amycterus metasternalis 
Amycterus mirabilis 
Amycterus mirabundus 
Amycterus impressus 
Amycterus crenatus 
Amycterus miraculus 
Amycterus mirus 
Amycterus paradoxus 
Amycterus monticola 
Amycterus morbillosus 
Amycterus orthodoxus 
Amycterus panduriformis 
Amycterus perlatus 
Amycterus pilbara 
Amycterus posticus 
Amycterus rayneri 
Amycterus riverinae 
Amycterus rufipes 
Amycterus sloanei 
Amycterus squalidus 
Amycterus subcostatus 
Amycterus sublaevigatus 
Amycterus sulcipennis 
Amycterus talpa 
Amycterus reticulatus 
Amycterus gyllenhali 
Amycterus taylori 
Amycterus tenebricosus 
Amycterus tessellatus 
Amycterus tomentosus 
Amycterus morbillosus 
Amycterus variegatus 
Amycterus variolosus 
Amycterus wilcoxii

Further reading

References

External links
Amycterus images from iNaturalist

Cyclominae
Curculionidae genera
Animals described in 1823
Taxa named by Carl Johan Schönherr